Côte D'Azur is The Rippingtons' sixteenth album which was released in 2011. The album features French, Latin, Gypsy and Euro rhythms. Saxophonist Jeff Kashiwa
is featured on the album, returning for the second album in a row.

Track listing
All songs composed by Russ Freeman, except Tracks 1 & 10 composed by Russ Freeman and Yaredt Leon.

"Cote D'Azur" - 4:21
"Le Calypso" - 3:32
"Bandol" - 3:50
"Sainte Maxime" - 4:15
"Postcards From Cannes" - 4:22
"Passage To Marseilles" - 3:40
"Provence" - 4:25
"Riviera Jam" - 3:25
"Rue Paradis" - 4:34
"Mesmerized" - 3:24

Personnel 
 Russ Freeman – keyboards, guitars, guitar synthesizer
 Bill Heller – keyboards 
 Rico Belled – bass
 Dave Karasony – drums
 Jeff Kashiwa – saxophones

Production 
 Russ Freeman – producer, executive producer, recording, mixing, additional package illustration 
 Andi Howard – executive producer, management 
 Bernie Grundman – mastering 
 Larissa Collins – art direction 
 Devon Guillery – graphic design 
 Bill Mayer – cover illustration
 Dave Hopley – photography

Studios
 Recorded and Mixed at Surfboard Studios (Boca Raton, Florida).
 Mastered at Bernie Grundman Mastering (Hollywood, California).

References

The Rippingtons albums
2011 albums